Kubja Vishnuvardhana I "Vishama-Siddhi" also known as  Bittarasa  (reigned 624–641 AD) was the brother of Chalukya Pulakeshin II. Vishnuvardhana I ruled the Vengi territories in eastern Andhra Pradesh as the viceroy under Pulakeshin II from around 615 AD.  Eventually, Vishnuvardhana declared his independence and started the Eastern Chalukya dynasty in (c. 624) AD.

The Eastern Chalukyas ruled the Vengi kingdom for nearly five centuries and had a very close relationship with the imperial Cholas.

Origin of Eastern Chalukyas

Pulakeshin II (608–644), the greatest Vatapi Chalukya king, conquered the eastern Deccan, corresponding the coastal districts of Andhra Pradesh 616, defeating the remnants of the Vishnukundina kingdom. He appointed his brother Kubja Vishnuvardhana as Viceroy. On the death of Pulakeshin II, the Vengi viceroyalty developed into an independent kingdom. The Eastern Chalukyas of Vengi outlived the main Vatapi dynasty by many generations.

Possible reason for the partition

Scholars are not in agreement as to why Vishnuvardhana declared himself king of the eastern Deccan territories of Pulakeshin II. What was the necessity for the partition of Vengi as a separate kingdom from the Badami Chalukyan empire? Hitherto it has been tacitly assumed that this was a formal division and Pulakeshin II conferred independent sovereignty of Vengi on his younger brother. It is improbable that a great warrior like Pulakeshin II could not have administered Vengi as part of his kingdom and felt the need for a separate king. The Kopparam plates make it clear that Kubja Vishnuvardhana was ruling only as a subordinate to his brother Pulakeshin II in the Vengi area. A revolution of Kubja Vishnuvardhana can be ruled out of account since he seems to have been very loyal and affectionate towards his brother.

Das Kornel posits that Pulakeshin II sent his younger brother Kubja Vishnuvardhana as viceroy to the Vengi region. There, the latter was able to subdue the Vishnukundina King (possibly Janasraya Madhava Varman) and carve out a kingdom for himself.

One possible reason could be the turn of events around middle of the 7th century in the Badami Chalukyan kingdom. The last few ruling years of Pulakeshin II ended in disaster. The great Pallava king Narasimhavarman I, inflicted a crushing defeat on the Chalukyas and burnt Badami. Pulakeshin II lost his life in this encounter. There was a period of confusion following these events. The five sons of Pulakeshin fought among themselves and tried to divide the kingdom into independent states. Pulakeshin's third son Vikramaditya I became the Chalukya king c. 642 and eventually restored order after defeating his brothers.

Vishnuvardhana's reign

Vishnuvardhana ruled over a kingdom extending from Nellore to Visakhapatnam. He assumed the title of Vishamasiddhi (conqueror of difficulties). Vishnuvardhana participated in the wars between his brother Pulakeshin II and the Pallava Narasimhavarma I and probably lost his life in battle in 641.

His son Jayasimha I succeeded him.

References 

 Durga Prasad, History of the Andhras up to 1565 A. D., P. G. Publishers, Guntur (1988)
 South Indian Inscriptions
 Nilakanta Sastri, K. A. (1955). A History of South India, OUP, New Delhi (Reprinted 2002).

7th-century Indian monarchs
Eastern Chalukyas